Outside In may refer to:

 Outside In (film), a 2017 film
 Outside In (book), a 2020 picture book
 Outside In (organization), a non-profit community clinic and youth service in Portland, Oregon
 Outside–in software development, a software development methodology

See also
 Outside Inside (disambiguation)
 Outside Looking In (disambiguation)
 Inside Out (disambiguation)